The Shri Venkateswara (Balaji) Temple is one of the largest functioning Hindu temples in Europe. It is dedicated in the Vaishnava tradition to a form of the Hindu god Vishnu. The temple is located in Tividale, West Midlands, England between the suburbs of Tipton and Oldbury, northwest of Birmingham city. The temple was designed with inspiration from the Tirupati Venkateswara Temple in Andhra Pradesh, India. The temple was consecrated and opened to the general public in August 2006.

The primary deity worshiped at this temple is Venkateswara, a well known manifestation of Vishnu. Within the main temple complex are also shrines to his consort Padmavati(Alamelu). The temple also houses shrines to other major Hindu deities Hanuman, Shiva, Karthikeya, Ganesh, Ayappan and the Navagraha.

The temple runs the Balaji School for Culture & Education which provides spiritual and cultural foundation for children and arranges classes on Veda (Hindu scriptures), music etc. The temple has a large Community Hall. The temple also provides free Matrimonial service by helps one find a suitable marriage partner.

On site facilities include a large community centre, a gatehouse and a Gandhi Peace Centre. The temple operates annadhanam services, providing free meals for visitors funded by donations. Seeing up to 1500 visitors during the weekdays and 2500 visitors in the weekends, the temple does not only cater to the religious and spiritual requirements of Hindus. It receives over one hundred visits from special interest groups all across the UK and Europe, while playing an active role in supporting the community by welcoming school trips, hosting various cultural events and holding classes and teaching sessions in Vedic studies and Sanskrit for young people.

The temple is a non-profit organisation and is a recognized charity in the UK.

References

External links 
 Shri Venkateswara (Balaji) Temple official site Dead link

Hindu temples in England
Religious buildings and structures in the West Midlands (county)
Tipton